The Vespa 946 is a scooter announced by Piaggio, to be sold under their Vespa brand starting in July 2013. Piaggio presented the retro-futurist Vespa Quarantasei concept, based on the 1945 Vespa MP6 prototype, at the 2011 EICMA motorcycle show. The final production version, renamed the Vespa 946, appeared the following year, at EICMA 2012.

Context and debut 
The scooter was anticipated by the Vespa Quarantasei concept, presented at EICMA 2011 which in shape recalls the very first Vespa MP6 of 1946, on which Piaggio debuted the new generation of air-cooled three-valve single-shaft four - stroke engines. GET divided into 125 cm³ and 150 cm³ displacements.

At EICMA 2012 (where it won the "best in show" award) the definitive version called Vespa 946 (which in the name recalls the 1946 debut year of the first Vespa) made its debut, adopting the same mechanical part as the concept , with the 125 cm³ and 150 cm³ air-cooled three-valve four-stroke engines and almost entirely reproducing their aesthetics and design.

Technique and design 
The 3-valve single-shaft distribution allows optimizing the inlet of the fuel-air mixture and the outlet of the exhaust gases, as well as mounting the spark plug in an optimal position, improving the thermal efficiency in combustion and at the same time ensuring optimal cooling of the parts inside the header. Bearings have been used for all moving parts in order to reduce internal friction. The 3-valve distribution solution compared to the 2-valve one is more effective as it improves intake. The performances for the 125 are: maximum power of 8.5 kW at 8250 rpm and maximum torque of 10.7 Nm at 6500 rpm.

The basic frame is made of welded sheet steel, but some parts and elements such as the front mudguard, handlebars, saddle or side panels are made of aluminum alloy. On the rear axle, for the first time, a brand new suspension was used with a single shock absorber with gas spring mounted horizontally with a progressive linkage system. In addition, there is the anti-lock braking system ABS and anti-skid traction control (ASR). The braking system consists of two discs, of which the front one is 220 mm.

The circular headlight consists of a single LED element. The design of the 946 is based on the historical Vespa models, taking up many elements such as the "low tail" rear part and the "suspended saddle" of the Vespa MP6. The saddle itself, the most characteristic element, is hinged on a die-cast aluminum support, covered in pre-waterproofed fabric.

Production takes place only through the marketing of limited or special editions built in a predefined number of specimens, which are put up for sale on an annual basis.

In 2016, the international jury of the XXIV Compasso d'Oro awarded the Vespa 946 with an honorable mention, in the "design for mobility" category.

Notes

External links
 

Piaggio Vespa